Eshgaft-e Tavileh (also Romanized as Eshgaft-e Ţavīleh; also known as Eshkaft and Eshkaft-e Ţavīleh) is a village in Jastun Shah Rural District, Hati District, Lali County, Khuzestan Province, Iran. At the 2006 census, its population was 23, in 6 families.

References 

Populated places in Lali County